Normanton is the name of:

England 
Normanton, Derby
South Normanton, Derbyshire
Temple Normanton, Derbyshire
Normanton, Leicestershire
Normanton, Lincolnshire
Normanton, Rutland
Normanton, West Yorkshire
Normanton (UK Parliament constituency) (old)
Normanton, Pontefract and Castleford (UK Parliament constituency) (new)
Normanton (rugby league), a former semi-professional club
Normanton, Wiltshire
Normanton le Heath, Leicestershire
Normanton on Soar, Nottinghamshire
Normanton-on-the-Wolds, Nottinghamshire
Normanton on Trent, Nottinghamshire

Australia 
Normanton, Queensland

Other 
 Normanton incident – a maritime incident off the coast of Japan in 1886
 Earl of Normanton

See also
Normantown (disambiguation)